Marta Schumann (February 4, 1919 in Valldal in Norddal – April 24, 1994 in Molde) is a Norwegian novelist, poet and short story writer. She made her literary début in 1969 with the historical novel Korset under Skuggefjellet, the first part of a trilogy set in the 18th century. She was awarded the Gyldendal's Endowment in 1980.

References

 
 
 

1919 births
1994 deaths
People from Møre og Romsdal
20th-century Norwegian poets
Norwegian women short story writers
Norwegian women novelists
20th-century Norwegian women writers
20th-century Norwegian novelists
Norwegian women poets
20th-century Norwegian short story writers